The UMB World Three-cushion Championship for National Teams is a professional carom billiards tournament in the discipline of three-cushion billiards where nations are represented by a team of two players. After the first three editions, which took place in various nations and were not scheduled regularly, the Union Mondiale de Billard decided to keep the championships situated in Viersen, Germany and to organize these championships annually.

List of champions
Below is the list of winning nations since 1981. From 2004 on, no third-place match was played and the third place was shared by the two semi-final losing teams.

Medals (1981-2023)

External links

References
 Official webpage

Three-cushion billiards competitions
World championships in carom billiards